Ann Estelle Patterson (born July 30, 1946) is an American jazz saxophonist and bandleader. She has worked extensively as a big band player and formed her own all-female big band, Maiden Voyage, in 1981, which was active into the 2000s.

References

American jazz saxophonists
American jazz bandleaders
1946 births
Living people
21st-century American saxophonists
20th-century American saxophonists
20th-century American women musicians
21st-century American women musicians
Women jazz saxophonists